Sonia Calizaya Huanca (born February 20, 1976 in La Paz) is a Bolivian marathon runner. She set both a national record and a personal best time of 2:45:05 at the 2007 Buenos Aires Marathon.

Calizaya represented Bolivia at the 2008 Summer Olympics in Beijing, where she competed for the women's marathon. She successfully finished the race in fifty-ninth place by nearly a second behind Greece's Eleni Donta, with a time of 2:45:53.

References

External links

NBC Olympics Profile

1976 births
Living people
Bolivian female marathon runners
Olympic athletes of Bolivia
Athletes (track and field) at the 2008 Summer Olympics
Sportspeople from La Paz